Alp Bilge Qağan or Eletmiş Qağan — was a Basmyl chief who rebelled and brought Second Turkic Khaganate to an end.

Reign 
His personal name was Ashina Shi (阿史那施) was a grandson of Ashina Duoxifu (阿史那咄悉匐), thus a grand-nephew to Ilterish and Qapaghan khagans. He successively fought against three Tujue leaders - Pan Kul Tigin, Kutluk Yabgu Khagan and Ozmish Qaghan.

In 742, he appointed Karluks to leadership of right wing and Uyghurs to leadership of left wing. However, he was soon deposed by Uyghurs, which signalled beginning of Uyghur Empire.

References

External links
Eletmiš Yabgu inscription complete text

Ashina house of the Turkic Empire
8th-century Turkic people
744 deaths
Leaders who took power by coup
Leaders ousted by a coup
Tengrist monarchs